Hojai or Hojaisa is a surname of the Dimasa people. Which means known as the son of a priest.

References 

Surnames of Indian origin
Dimasa-language surnames
Surnames